The Waterside (Ulster-Scots: Wattèrbroo) generally refers to the part of Derry on the east bank of the River Foyle. Traditionally, the Waterside ends at the Caw roundabout near the Foyle Bridge. Areas such as Eglinton and Limavady are not part of the Waterside.

The Waterside is a mainly Protestant and unionist area, while the rest of Derry City is mainly Irish Catholic and nationalist. During the Troubles, the Waterside's Protestant population grew, probably as a result of Protestants moving there from the west side of the river.

The Waterside contains the city's main hospital, Altnagelvin, as well as St. Columb's Park and the former Ebrington Parade Ground. It is linked to the west side of the city via the Foyle Bridge, Craigavon Bridge, and the Peace Bridge.

Transport
Londonderry railway station is in this area, and is often referred to as Waterside station, a name it held when the city of Derry had three stations, the other two being the Graving Dock station and the Foyle Road station.

Notable people
Gregory Campbell, Unionist politician
Paul Dixon, footballer (association)
Daryl Gurney, professional darts player

References

Derry (city)